Jadaan Mohanna Al-Shammeri (born 12 January 1992) is a Saudi football player who plays as a midfielder, most recently for Al-Qaisumah.

Honours
Al-Batin
MS League: 2019–20

External links

References

1992 births
Living people
Saudi Arabian footballers
Al Batin FC players
Al-Qaisumah FC players
Saudi Second Division players
Saudi First Division League players
Saudi Professional League players
Association football midfielders